The Roman Catholic Diocese of Idah is a Latin suffragan diocese located in the city of Idah, Kogi State in the Ecclesiastical province of Abuja, in Nigeria, yet remains subject to the Roman missionary Congregation for the Evangelization of Peoples.

Idah is located along the Niger river in Kogi State of Nigeria. The diocese mainly serves the Igala and Bassa ethnic groups, who live in the Igala Kingdom ruled by the Attah Igala, along the Niger and Benue rivers, below their confluence, around Lokoja.

Antecedents 
The diocese was first evangelized by the Spiritans (Congregatio Sancti Spiritus [C.S.Sp] a.k.a. Holy Ghost Fathers). The first missionary to the diocese was Father Joseph Liechtenberger, who was sent to the area in 1902, and later missionaries of the same order, including Irish bishop Joseph Shanahan, were the progenitors of the first Catholic mission in Dekina. By 1905, this mission closed as a result of the hostility of the local community, constituted mainly of Muslim communities.

Bishop Shanahan, the ordinary of Onitsha archdiocese, called upon the German spiritans working in the then Benue Province to collaborate in reopening the Igala area to Catholicism. Fr. Anthony Konrath, a German Spiritan, reopened Catholicism in the area around 1932, operating out of Utonkon.  He engaged in vigorous pastoral ministrations, visiting Ankpa and its vicinities such as Imane and Ojoku, celebrating masses for Catholic soldiers at the old Ankpa military barrack, Catholic residents and traders, especially of Igbo stock, residing within the area. He also visited and introduced Catholicism into adjoining areas. Reaching Idah in 1934 Fr. Konrath and his associates set up camp, establishing Idah as the headquarters of their Catholic operations, the first parish in what became Idah diocese.

The cathedral church in Idah is named after the German missionary and bishop St. Boniface. The diocese of Idah continues to have a link with Germany, especially the Roman Catholic Diocese of Fulda, which since 1990 has helped to train seminarians and priests for Idah diocese, and undertaken various ecclesial initiatives and social projects.

The Second World War truncated the German missionary efforts in this area. They were arrested and interned in the Caribbean, as Nigeria was a British territory. At the end of the war they were returned to Germany, being replaced by English and Irish missionary priests from the Benue Province and later Nsukka area. Nigerian indigenous missionaries, such as the bishops John Cross Anyogu and Anthony Nwedo also carried out missionary activities.

The Spiritan priests from Canada (mainly from around the Montreal, Quebec region) continued as missionaries there and in the neighboring diocese of Lokoja in the 1950s, building ecclesiastical structures and institutions. The Canadian missionaries provided personnel and material resources until the indigenous clergy and religious began to take over pastoral responsibilities; some Canadians remained.

Apart from priests, there are many religious orders of women and men in Idah diocese. While some of these orders, such as the Holy Rosary sisters and Congregatio Sancti Spiritus (Holy Ghost sisters) in Ankpa, Inyano and Ogugu, are old, and possess a relatively long ecclesiastical history in providing pastoral, social and healthcare services alongside the Canadian missionary priests, Bishop Obot brought Nigerian-founded religions congregations into the diocese, especially of women, such as the Handmaid of the Holy Child Jesus (HHCJ) in Idah and Okpo; the Daughters of Divine Love (D.D.L.) in Egume, Imane and Idah; the Daughters of Mary Mother of Mercy (D.M.M.M.) in Sheria, Abejukolo and Ayangba. The order of Discalded Carmelites nuns branch also established their community in Okura, in 2000.

The Marist Brothers of Schools have also had a long history in the diocese teaching at the Our Lady of Schools, Ayangba. A women's religious congregation, Marist Missionary Daughter of the Society of Jesus the Good Shepherd, though founded as a Pious Association in Uturu, Okigwe in 1989, received canonical approval from Bishop Ephraim Silas Obot on November 27, 2000, at the Holy Cross Parish, Dekina. Marist Brother Thomas Ezeaku established a school, with the approval and support of Obot, patterned upon the model of the Marist Brothers Secondary School in Uturu, Okigwe, in Ejule and Ayangba.

Prior to Obot's arrival two Nigerian priests, later bishops, John Cross Anyogu and Anthony Nwedo, were active in the area as missionaries in the 1940s and 1950s.

Equally, the church of Idah has embraced lovingly and cordially within its prebystery priests whose natal origines emanate from other Nigerian regions or dioceses. Idah dioceses have priests with hometowns from such places as Achi in Oji River, Enugu State, Nsukka area of Enugu State, Agenebode in Edo State, Igarra in Edo State, Idoma area of Benue State, Owerri in Imo State, Awka, Enugu Agidi, and Enugu-Ukwu in Anambra State among many areas and dioceses of Nigeria.

The church in Idah diocese continued to grow, with more priestly and religious vocations, under the leadership of Obot, its first bishop (from December 1977 to April 2009).

Following the death of Bishop Obot, Anthony Adaji, Missionary Society of St. Paul (M.S.P.), auxiliary bishop of the diocese since June 28, 2007, was named by the Holy See the second bishop on June 1, 2009.

History 

The first recorded Christian activities in this area are attributed to the services of the Church Missionary Society, a branch of Anglicanism, especially members of the 1841 British Niger Expedition, that included the African and Yoruba ex-slave, Samuel Ajayi Crowther, later to become an Anglican Bishop. The first Catholic activities took place in Dekina in 1902. Catholic missionaries of the Congregatio Sancti Spiritus (Holy Ghost Congregation) were seemingly drawn into the area upon the invitation of the Society of African Mission (SMA) then based in Asaba for missionary collaboration around that territory. Initial efforts intended to establish the Catholic faith faltered after the missionaries and the Attah could not reach any conclusion. Later, Sir Frederick D. Lugard invited these Catholic missionaries to explore the area of Dekina, coming in through Lokoja, and in 1902, Joseph Lichtenberger became the first missionary and presumably said the first mass in this area. Even this missionary experiment later failed woefully, due to the adversity of the indigenous population and Islamic adherents, and the sheer lack of supportive resources and the arid environment, incapable of sustaining the rigors of the initial phase of this missionary encounter.

A later mission was elevated to the status of an Apostolic prefecture of Idah on September 26, 1968, on territory split off from the Roman Catholic Diocese of Lokoja. Monsignor Leopold Grimard, a Canadian Spiritan priest, was named as its first prefect apostolic.

On December 17, 1977, Pope Paul VI promoted the prefecture to the status of the Diocese of Idah. On that day Peter Usman Ujah was being ordained in Awo-Akpali by Bishop Augustus Delisle, bishop of Lokoja. Bishop Silas Obot, until then auxiliary bishop of Ikot-Ekpene diocese, was named bishop of the new diocese.

Obot thereafter left his native homeland diocese of Ikot-Ekpene for Idah, formally installed on April 30, 1978, in the Cathedral Church of St. Boniface, Idah. Obot was named to the episcopate on June 28, 1971, at the age of 35. He was consecrated as a bishop in Ikot-Ekpene on October 31, 1971.

In the first priestly ordination of the new diocese of Idah was of Abel Shigiri Bida in Sheria, Bassa Local Government on December 16, 1978. Bida became the first and only Bassa Komo priest for the Diocese of Idah until nearly two decades later, when Fr. Timothy Megida was ordained in July 1997. Later Dominic Adama and John Iyere were ordained.

In 1982 Obot established the St. Kizito Minor Seminary (High School Seminary), Iyegwu-Idah. In July 1994 he ordained the first priest—Attah Anthony Agbali—from the Cathedral church of Idah.

On the same day, together with Fr. Attah Anthony Agbali, the first Igala Spiritan priest, Fr. Daniel Ojochide Abah, was also raised to the altar of eternal service during the same priestly ordination ceremony, celebrated at St. Boniface Cathedral. Fr. Abah, as it would turn out would be the first priest of the diocese to be assigned as a missionary following his sending to South Africa for his priestly ministrations. He would spend over a decade of missionary service in South Africa, before relocating to Canada to continue as a missionary. He has since been elected as a regional superior of his congregation, hence returning to Nigeria to take up this appointment.

Later on, another Anthony, a priest with origins from the diocese, Fr. Anthony Ademu Adaji, who was ordained on July 1, 1995, at the Missionary Seminary of St. Paul (M.S.P) would also trail the path of his forebear, Fr. Daniel Abah to also become a missionary to South Africa, Fr. Adaji would eventually become the first Igala Catholic and priest to be raised to the episcopal office as auxiliary bishop on June 28, 2007; and equally the first member of his apostolic society of the Missionary of St. Paul to be so elevated. Upon the death of the incumbent and hardworking ordinary of Idah diocese, Bishop Obot, Most Rev. Anthony Adaji was appointed as his successor to the see of the diocese of Idah, as ordinary by the Holy See on July 2, 2009. Therefore, he would become the second and incumbent ordinary of the diocese.

Other indigenes of the diocese continues to follow these missionary paths serving in differing churches, dioceses, and institutions providing priestly ministry and religious services within Nigeria and outside Nigerian shores, serving around the globe in the older churches of the United States, Canada, Europe and Ethiopia, among other places. Many continue to heed to the clarion call to bring the goodness to their fellow men and women as consecrated religious and as missionaries.

In July 1995, Bishop Obot ordained the first graduates of the St. Kizito Minor Seminary, that he established in 1982 to become Catholic priests. The firsts to be so ordained to the sacred priesthood were Frs. James Ojo and Kizito Okeke, who were among the pioneer class of that young minor seminary in 1982, and also its first graduates.  In December 1995, he ordained more graduates of the St. Kizito Seminary, who incidentally were also the first set of Idah diocesan seminarians to train outside Nigeria in the archdiocesan seminary of Fulda, Germany, in a program of mutual support by that German archdiocese, in fidelity to mutuality of ecclesial affinity.  It is notable to note that both diocese equally share St. Boniface as their patron saints- as their cathedral churches are named after that famed saints.  These are the Fr. Innocent Oyibo and the late Godwin Ekwujo Sixtus Onuh.

As an attestation to growth, and equally an affirmation of the important role the minor seminary had begun to play, as a feeder of priestly vocations, in 1996, Bishop Obot was elated to ordain the first large set of priests than any he had until that point as priests for the diocese. The priests so ordained were: Frs. Jeremiah Musa, Louis Illah, Samuel Akagwu, Sebastian Musa, Albert Shaibu, and Anthony Eseke. Five of these were ordained at a single ordination ceremony at the Sacred Heart Church, Ankpa, Kogi State in July of that year. The last one, Rev. Anthony Eseke, was ordained in his patrimonial home of Enugu-Ukwu, Anambra State later that month to the sacred priesthood.

In addition to increase in priestly and religious vocations, the diocese of Idah has increased exponentially. Many parishes have been added to the original eleven parishes then extant when Bishop Obot came to Idah diocese in 1978. These new parishes- and quasi-parishes, and educational institution chaplaincies. These are Ogugu (1991), Ejule (1994), Odeke (1996), Okura (1996), Okenyi (2002); Igalaogba (2004); Ajaka (2005), Ikanekpo (2005), Ogodo (2008), Itobe (autonomous Christian community - 2006), St. Thomas Moore Chaplaincy - Federal Polytechnic, Idah (1983), College of Education Chaplaincy, Ankpa (1984); St. Augustine's Chalaincy - Kogi State University, Ayangba (1999); Kogi State School of Health Technology, Idah (2005), Our Lady of Schools (2005).

Though not directly diocesan entities Catholic private academies interested in providing qualitative and Catholic education have been established by a professed Marist brother of Schools at Ejule, Ayangba and Dekina.

During the time of Bishop Obot, primary/nursery education was also given great priorities. At the primary school level, private Catholic education have been encouraged and motivated since around 1984, when the St. Thomas Moore Society of the St. Joseph's Catholic Church (Parish), Ayangba, established a nursery/primary school. This private initiative has always been moderated and modulated by the parish authorities and community.

In 1983, at the wake of the extinction of the Idah Local Government - Idah Women Nursery/Primary School, then at the site of the Catholic owned Holy Rosary College, the Catholic diocese of Idah, through the direct initiative and encouragement of Bishop Obot (Proprietor), established the Holy Nursery/Primary School at the site located in-between (almost spatially sandwiched) St. Peter's College (High School), Holy Rosary Convent, Idah, and Holy Rosary College (High school), Idah. This school was entrusted to the direct management, educational operations and controls, as a mission of the Congregation of the Handmaid of the Holy Child Jesus Sisters (H.H.C.J.) under a board management supervised by the Catholic Educations Office. Since, other similar parochial schools have followed in different parishes such as the Redemeer Primary and Secondary School, Ankpa, originally begun in the 1990s through direct funding and management by the parish community of Sacred Heart Parish, Ankpa.

The diocese of Idah has had its sad moments. In 1980, the first priest ordained for the diocese, Fr. Dominic Arome, died in a motor vehicle accident. In September 1992, Fr. Reuben Ahmodu, also died due to ill-health. Fr. Gerald Arome, also as a result of ill-health died in October 1999. In 2002, a diocesan seminarian, Rev. Mr. Leo Ejeh, died in an automobile vehicle accident, while returning to the diocese on vacation. Then in the latter part of 2002, a beloved priest, Fr. Raphael Oguche, drowned after his boat capsized while returning to his riverine Odeke, Ibaji parish.

The year 2003 was a very disconcerting one for many in the diocese. Frs. Matthias Sabo Ahiaba and Godwin Onuh died in January 2003—Fr. Ahiaba  after a protracted but sudden illness in Enugu, and Fr. Godwin Onuh quietly in his sleep in faraway, Fulda, Germany, where he was engaged in his doctoral studies in the New Testaments scriptures.  Fr. Charles Mackay, a Canadian Spiritan missionary, followed shortly afterwards, after long years of priestly and missionary service in the area. In spite of these seemingly sad moments, the diocese celebrated its Silver Jubilee of existence.

On Easter morning, April 12, 2009, Bishop Ephraim Obot died.  On January 24, 2010, a young priest, Fr. Kenneth Omachonu Ojoma, who was a resident priest and theology (Bioethics) graduate student at St. Jerome's Parish, Los Angeles, CA, US and Loyola Marymount University, in Los Angeles, died in Abuja, Nigeria while receiving medical care on a visit home to Nigeria. Fr. Ojoma was ordained a priest in July 2001, and had performed pastoral duties, including at parishes in the diocese of Idah. Monsignor Abel Shigiri Bida, the first priest ordained for the newly created Idah diocese on December 16, 1978, died in Enugu on May 5, 2010, following complications from illness.

The pastoral care of the diocese was inspired and grounded upon the lived humility and acutely humane qualities exhibited by the bishop, Ephraim Obot.

In the last few years, Bishop Obot bore enormous physical pain. "This too shall pass away," was his concise mode of expressing his situation and carrying his physical burden with courage and gait, entrusted all to God.

As a testimony to the nurtured growth of many years, and in need of some episcopal assistance for the ailing bishop, on June 28, 2007, the Holy See named first scion of the diocese, a missionary priest with the Missionary of St. Paul, Fr. Anthony Adaji, M.S.P., as the auxiliary bishop of Idah.

Bishop Obot died on Easter Sunday, April 12, 2009, marking a bold statement that attests to the qualitative expression and exhibition of the Christian faith, that defined and vividly characterized how he lived, and what he preached. He lived his life guided ultimately by God's grace while consistently profoundly rooted in his love for the church. He would be greatly missed. However, the priests, religious, and faithful are reassured by his death on Easter day; perceived as a Holy death; where our beloved bishop would share in the life of Christ, which he celebrated in the Eucharist with great reverence and devotion.

In October 1996, when Bishop Obot was privileged to celebrate his silver jubilee anniversary as a bishop, his thoughts, teachings, and perspectives, were codified and compiled into a book, Words and Good Deeds Together (Makurdi: Onaivi Publication, 1996- ). This derived mainly from his many pastoral letters to his priests, religious, and faith since 1976, homilies, and reflections. This enriching compendium is a repository of erudition, showcasing the organic faith and personality that penned it, serving as an in depth template for reflection on the Christian existence and experience.

During his lifetime Bishop Obot nurtured priestly and religious vocations by his preachings and teachings, especially his lifestyle of commitment and dedication to the faith and the church. He was very resilient and energetic, he ensured the training of his priests in different areas of academic interests sending them to train in Canada, Rome, Italy; and the United States, and also within Nigeria. He built many convents for religious women and men, and helped to integrate their apostolates within the diocese; visualizing them as possessing relevant roles and forming a crucial part of the church's identity. This thinking was rooted in his understanding and evolving profound ecclesiology that perceived the church as the family of God's people, where each and everyone has a critical role to play in promoting and shaping its multivalent features.

Many Catholic schools, nursery, primary, and secondary schools were established or supported in their missions during his episcopate.  Invested in the church's social teachings he ensured the establishment of primary and secondary healthcare institutions in Akpanya, Sheria, Abejukolo, Awo-Akpali; Inyano and Onyedega, Ibaji; and Egume in catering to the healthcare needs of the population.  His support of the Diocesan Development Services initiative, which was initially headed by a very active Irish woman religious, member of the Holy Rosary Congregation of sisters, simple but committed, hardworking and insightful, Sr. Nora McNamara, sordidly brought recognition to the social justice efforts of the diocese at the global level.

On June 1, 2009, Auxiliary Bishop Adaji was named the new bishop, as the second bishop of Idah diocese. Bishop Anthony Adaji also becomes the first Igala son to become the bishop of Idah diocese.

Special churches 
The Cathedral episcopal see is a St. Boniface Cathedral, in Idah, which takes its name from the German missionary founding bishop of Fulda, St. Boniface (Winifred). The second and now consolidated evangelization and missionary efforts of the German Spiritan missionaries represented by Fathers Anthony Konrath, Schrol, Monsignor Kristen and others were entrenched in the 1930s. They selected Idah as the first parish in the present Idah diocese, and built the first church dedicated to St. Boniface, the indomitable Winifred, apostle of the faith in their native Germany, especially revered around Fulda.

The missionary efforts of the German priests was short-lived as a result of the Second World War (World War II), when they were interned being considered as "enemy aliens" given that Idah diocese is part of the British colony. They left Idah for Enugu, and onward to the Caribbeans, and after the war returned to Germany.

The feast day of the Cathedral, and consequently of the diocese is June 5, following the Roman Catholic liturgical calendar. Idah diocese, especially through the fervent efforts of the first bishop, the late Most Rev. Ephraim Silas Obot (December 17, 1977 – April 12, 2009), the diocese has continued to maintain links with the Diocese of Fulda.

The Diocese of Fulda has helped trained a number of seminarians and priests for the diocese of Idah. The women of the Fulda diocese and other groups within Germany have continued to support different missionary projects of the entire diocese. Specifically the Catholic Women Organization (C.W.O.) of Idah diocese and the diocese of Fulda, Catholic women has a long lasting relationship due to the efforts of Bishop Obot, enabling the fostering of such collaboration between the older and younger church in a missionary spirit of faith enrichment, material empowerment and relational wellbeing.

Ordinaries 
(all Roman rite)

Apostolic  Prefect of Idah 
 Fr. Leopold Grimard, C.S.Sp. (October 4, 1968 – death 1977)

Suffragan bishops of Idah

Ephraim Silas Obot 
Ephraim Silas Obot (born in Adiasim, Ikot Ekpene on October 6, 1936, ordained June 29, 1968, consecrated as a bishop on October 31, 1971, in Ikot Ekpene) (December 17, 1977 – April 12, 2009); previously Titular Bishop of Iunca in Byzacena and auxiliary bishop of Ikot Ekpene, Nigeria (June 28, 1971 – December 16, 1977). In April 1978, he assumed control of the diocese of Idah, following his installation ceremony at the Cathedral of St. Boniface, Idah. He was its bishop until his death on Easter Day, April 12, 2009, at Bishop Shanahan Hospital, Enugu. He set up diocesan institutions and infrastructures within his new diocese of Idah. From four indigenous priests he met in 1978, Idah diocese later came to have close to a hundred priests working within the diocese, and in other dioceses within Nigeria, Europe, and the United States; died on Easter Sunday, April 12, 2009, at his episcopal residence in Idah, and was buried on May 1, 2009, at the right side of the sanctuary in the St Boniface Cathedral.

Anthony Ademu Adaji 
Anthony Ademu Adaji, MSP (born October 13, 1963 – ) (named by Pope Benedict XVI on June 1, 2009 – ... ); previously Titular Bishop of Turuda (28 Jun 2007  – 1 Jun 2009) & Auxiliary Bishop of Idah (June 28, 2007 – May 31, 2009) Bishop Obot had nominated Bishop Adaji's elevation, working alongside the Metropolitan of the Abuja Archdiocese, Archbishop John Onaiyekan, as auxiliary bishop of the same diocese in June 2007.

The first Igala member and priest of the Nigerian Church founded Missionary Society of St. Paul, by the name of Anthony, became the first bishop of Igala extraction—both as an auxiliary and later a full bishop.

Auxiliary Bishop
Anthony Ademu Adaji, M.S.P.N. (2007-2009), appointed Bishop here

References

Sources and external links
 GCatholic.org Information
 Catholic Hierarchy

Sources 
 Anthony Agbali, "Igala Response to Colonial Destabilization and Fragmentation," in Toyin Falola, The Dark Webs: Perspectives on Colonialism in Africa, (Durham, N.C.: Carolina Academic Press, 2005), 90–137.
 Ephraim Obot, Words and Good Deeds Together, (Makurdi, Nigeria: Onaivi Printing and Publishing, Inc., 1996).
 Jordan, John P., Bishop Shanahan of Southern Nigeria, (Dublin, Ireland: Elo Press, 1971 [1949]).
 Celestine A. Obi, " Background to the Planting of Catholic Christianity in the Lower Niger," book chapter in Celestine A. Obi, Vincent A. Nwosu, Casmir Eke, K.B.C. Onwubiko, and F.E. Okon (ed.), A Hundred Years of the Church in Eastern Nigeria 1885–1985, (Onitsha, Nigeria: Africana-FEP Publishers, 1985, pp. 1–26)- specific reference to Dekina as part of the Lower Niger Prefecture on page 26.
 __, "The French Pioneers 1885–1905" book chapter in Celestine Obi, et al., A Hundred Years of the Church, pp. 27–106- specific references detailing the Church in Dekina on pp. 82–84.
 "The Missionary Contributions of Bishop Joseph Shanahan, C.S.Sp., 1902–1932," book chapter in Celestine Obi, et al. (ed)., A Hundred Years of the Church, pp. 107–174 specifically it details Fr. Shanahan's time in Dekine between 1904–1905 helping Fr. Joseph Lichtenberger. Fr. Harry would later join them. The Holy Ghost superior general would travel over two hundred miles to Dekina to say his final goodbyes to these confreres as a significant gesture of apostolic and priestly communion, unity, and solidly humanitarian gesture.
 Philip Okwoli, An Outline History of the Catholic Church, 1934–1984, (Nsukka, Nigeria: Hosanna Press, 1984). 
 Philip Okowli, A Short History of Igala, (Ilorin, Nigeria: Mantanmi Press, 1973).
 Vatican Information News Service (Vatican City), Pontifical Acts June 28, 2007
 Vatican Information News Service (Vatican City),  Other Pontifical Acts, June 1, 2009.

Roman Catholic dioceses in Nigeria
Christian organizations established in 1968
Roman Catholic dioceses and prelatures established in the 20th century
Roman Catholic Ecclesiastical Province of Abuja